Oldland Abbotonians Football Club is a semi-professional football club based in Oldland Common South Gloucestershire, England. The club is affiliated to the Somerset County FA and Gloucestershire County FA.

History

The club was founded as St. Annes (Oldland) in 1910. The current incarnation of the club was formed from a merger between Oldland and Longwell Green Abbotonians in 1998. Oldland had played in the Gloucestershire County League on-and-off since 1974. Meanwhile, Longwell Green Abbotonians had been playing in the Somerset Senior League since 1985, winning Division One in 1993–94.

Current squad

References

External links
Official club website

Football clubs in England
Western Football League
Football clubs in Bristol
1910 establishments in England
Association football clubs established in 1910
Bristol and District Football League
Bristol Premier Combination
Bristol and Avon Association Football League